Mohamed Boumezrag Olympic Stadium is a multi-use stadium in Chlef, Algeria.  It is currently used mostly for football matches and is the home ground of ASO Chlef. The stadium holds 18,000 people.

References

External links 
 Stade Mohamed Boumezrag - soccerway.com
 StadiumDB page

Football venues in Algeria
Buildings and structures in Chlef Province
ASO Chlef